Today (also titled Marty Robbins Today on the album disc label) is a studio album by American country music singer Marty Robbins (Martin David Robinson, September 26, 1925 – December 8, 1982) released in 1971 on the Columbia Records label (1972 in the UK). It reached No. 15 in the US country charts and No. 175 in the US album charts. The sleeve artwork was a reference to Robbins's passion for driving NASCAR racing cars.

Track listing

Side one
"Early Morning Sunshine" (Jack Marshall) – 2:44
"The Late and Great Lover" (Bud D. Johnson) – 2:09
"I’m Not Blaming You" (Billy Mize) – 2:30
"Another Day Goes By" (Don Winters, Jr., Dennis Winters) – 2:56
"Thanks, But No Thanks, Thanks to You" (Coleman Harwell II) – 2:36
"Quiet Shadows" (Cheryl Blanchard, Barbara Blanchard) – 2:36

Side two
"Too Many Places" (Don Winters) – 3:03
"You Say It’s Over" (Jimmy Sweeney) – 2:24
"Put a Little Rainbow in Your Pocket" (Bob Binkley, Phoebe Binkley) – 2:16
"Seventeen Years" (Marty Robbins) – 2:30
"The Chair" (Marty Robbins) – 4:11

Production

Produced by Marty Robbins
Arranged by Bill McElhiney
Album design by Ron Coro
Album photography by Pal Parker

References

1971 albums
Columbia Records albums
Marty Robbins albums